Apataki is a coral atoll in the South Pacific Ocean, territorially part of French Polynesia. It is one of the Palliser Islands, a subgroup of the Tuamotu Archipelago. Two navigable passes enter its wide lagoon.

, Apataki Atoll has 350 inhabitants, down from 492 in 2007. The main village is called Niutahi.

History
The first recorded European to sight Apataki Atoll was Dutch navigator Jakob Roggeveen in 1722. It was visited by James Cook in 1774. On 27 May 1902, while Paul Gauguin was living in the Marquesas Islands, the mail-boat Croix du Sud between Papeete and Atuona was shipwrecked at Apataki. leading to a three-month loss of supplies for the islanders.

There is a domestic airfield in Apataki which was inaugurated in 1977. The island appears in some maps as "Hagemeister Island".

Administration
Administratively, Apataki Atoll is part of the commune of Arutua.

Economy
Apataki is connected to the world via Apataki Airport but has no tourism industry. The only main industry of the island is cultured Tahitian (black) pearls. The coconut palm, which forms the basis for copra (dried coconut) production, used to be of special economic importance to the islanders. On a few islands, the residents cultivate vanilla. Agriculture is generally limited to simple subsistence.  Pandanus leaves are traditionally woven together as roof thatch (although corrugated sheet metal is also used today), as well as for other items such as mats and hats.

Apataki's two large reef passes provide excellent diving and surfing, both of which are serviced by local boat-based charter companies. Land-based accommodations do not exist.

Cuisine
Fruit and vegetable staples include yams, taro, and breadfruit, as well as a wide range of tropical fruits.

Flora and fauna
The sparse soil of Apataki cannot sustain a great variety of vegetation. The animal life on the islands consists mostly of seabirds, landcrabs, insects, and lizards. The underwater fauna, however, is rich and varied, making scuba diving a popular activity for tourists.

References

Atolls of the Tuamotus